Perryton High School is a public high school located in Perryton, Texas (USA) and classified as a 4A school by the UIL.  It is part of the Perryton Independent School District located in north central Ochiltree County.  In 2011, the school was rated "Met Standard" by the Texas Education Agency.

Athletics
The Perryton Rangers compete in the following sports 

Cross Country, Volleyball, Football, Basketball, Powerlifting, Golf, Tennis, Track, Softball, Baseball, Soccer & Marching Band

Notable Athletes 
 - Mike Hargrove - MLB - 1974-1985 as player, 1991-2007 as manager, 1974 AL Rookie of the Year, 1975 All Star
 - Caleb Campbell - NFL - 2008 - 7th round draft choice of the Detroit Lions
 - Jeremy Campbell - Team USA Track and Field Paralympic Athlete - 6 time medalist - 4 Gold and 2 Silver for the Discus Throw
 - Janet Becerril - IPF Powerlifting - 2016 & 2017 - 2 time National Champion, 2 time World Champion - World Record holder for the bench press(83kg) and total(348kg) for the  sub junior 43kg weight class
 - Josue Becerril - USA Powerlifting - 2019 - National Champion for the sub junior 74kg weight class
 - Saleen Nyman - IPF Powerlifting - 2022 - National Champion, World Champion for the sub junior 43kg weight class
 - Alejandra Salas - IPF Powerlifting - 2022 - National Champion, World Champion for the sub junior 84kg weight class
 - Christian Laja - IPF Powerlifting - 2022 - National Champion, World Champion for the sub junior 83kg weight class

State titles
Girls Cross Country 
1988(3A)
Boys Golf 
2002(3A)
Girls Powerlifting 
2021 (4A D2)

Boys Powerlifting 
2022 (4A)

References

External links
Perryton ISD

Public high schools in Texas
Schools in Ochiltree County, Texas